James S. Stack (September 14, 1852 – December 14, 1920) was an American judge, hotel owner, and politician.

Biography
Born on a farm near Detroit, Michigan, Stack and his family moved to Ishpeming, Michigan and then to Brown County, Minnesota. In 1873, Stack moved to Fargo, Dakota Territory. He was in the land business, served as deputy United States marshal, and was Fargo municipal judge. In 1887, Stack moved to Superior, Wisconsin and was in the hotel business from 1887 to 1889. He then served as Indian agent in Cloquet, Minnesota from 1889 to 1891. Stack served as under sheriff of Douglas County, Wisconsin. From 1899 to 1903, Stack served as Wisconsin Deputy Railroad Commissioner. He also served as acting judge of the Douglas County municipal court. In 1909, Stack served in the Wisconsin State Assembly and was a Republican. Stack died in Hot Springs, Arkansas in 1920.

References

External links

1852 births
1920 deaths
Politicians from Detroit
Politicians from Fargo, North Dakota
Politicians from Superior, Wisconsin
Wisconsin state court judges
Dakota Territory judges
19th-century American judges
Businesspeople from Wisconsin
Republican Party members of the Wisconsin State Assembly
Lawyers from Fargo, North Dakota
19th-century American lawyers